Jeremiah Trotter (born January 20, 1977) is a former American football linebacker who played in the National Football League (NFL) for twelve seasons. He played college football at Stephen F. Austin State University and was drafted by the Philadelphia Eagles in the third round of the 1998 NFL Draft.

Trotter is one of just four linebackers in Eagles history to earn four or more Pro Bowl invitations, joining Chuck Bednarik, Maxie Baughan and Bill Bergey in that select group. Trotter has also been a member of the Washington Redskins and Tampa Bay Buccaneers.

Early years
Trotter attended Hooks High School in Hooks, Texas and was a letterman in football. In football, he was a three-time all district honoree and was named the District MVP as a senior.

Professional career

Philadelphia Eagles
Trotter was drafted by the Philadelphia Eagles in the third round of the 1998 NFL Draft. In his first year with the Eagles as a backup, he recorded only six tackles. In his second season, newly hired Head Coach Andy Reid named Trotter the starting middle linebacker. Over the next three seasons, he led the team in tackles. In four seasons with the Eagles, he had accumulated 361 tackles, nine sacks, five interceptions and four forced fumbles. He also made two straight Pro Bowls in the 2000 and 2001 seasons.

Trotter and the Eagles defense ranked second in the NFL in 2001, earning them their first NFC East championship since 1988. The Eagles would go to the NFC Championship that year for the first time since 1980, but lost to the St. Louis Rams. Following the loss, Trotter became a free agent. He was designated with the franchise tag by the Eagles, but after failing to agree on a contract, became a free agent.

Washington Redskins
Trotter signed a seven-year, $36 million contract with the Washington Redskins on April 19, 2002. On June 1, 2004, after just two seasons into his contract, Trotter was released. In his two seasons with the Redskins, Trotter recorded over 200 tackles and 1.5 sacks.

Second stint with Eagles

Trotter returned to the Eagles for the 2004 season, signing a one-year contract worth the veteran minimum.

Prior to re-signing Trotter, the Eagles run defense was among the worst in the NFL. Trotter became the starter midway through the 2004 season, and immediately improved the defense. That year, the Eagles advanced to their first Super Bowl since 1980, marking Trotter's first appearance in the championship game, though they would lose by a narrow margin to the defending champion New England Patriots, 24-21. At the end of the season, Trotter re-signed with the Eagles to a five-year contract worth $15 million, opting to return despite a larger contract offer from Kansas City.

During the 2005 season opener, about 40 minutes before kickoff between the Eagles and Atlanta Falcons, Trotter and Falcons' cornerback Kevin Mathis got into a fight during pregame warmups. After officials reviewed video to see who instigated the fight, both Trotter and Mathis were ejected before kickoff. Terry Bradshaw said about the incident, "No one's been thrown out of a house that fast since my last divorce". The fight led to an NFL rules change where non-kickers cannot enter a neutral zone between the 45-yard-lines prior to the game.

Trotter was voted to the Pro Bowl in 2005, being the only Eagle to be voted outright by the fans that season (Brian Dawkins was named to the Pro Bowl as an alternate). He was once again named to the Pro Bowl in 2006. On August 21, 2007, the Philadelphia Eagles released the veteran linebacker from the remainder of his second contract. The position of middle linebacker was filled by two-year veteran Omar Gaither.

Tampa Bay Buccaneers
On September 3, 2007 the Tampa Bay Buccaneers signed Trotter to a one-year deal.

Third stint with Eagles
After Stewart Bradley tore his ACL during training camp, the Eagles needed an experienced middle linebacker to take his place for the season. Trotter worked out on September 25, 2009 with the Eagles and signed a one-year contract. The following offseason, after allowing Brian Dawkins to leave via free agency, the Eagles cut ties with most of their NFC Championship squad, by trading Donovan McNabb, releasing Brian Westbrook, and not re-signing Trotter.

NFL statistics

Regular season

Postseason

Business ventures
Trotter has been involved in various business ventures in addition to his football career. In 2000, he opened a salon called T&I Unisex Salon, located in Willingboro, New Jersey. In 2003, Trotter opened a car wash business called Trott's Spot Car Wash, located in Cherry Hill, New Jersey, and he also owns two car washes in neighboring Voorhees. The car wash in Cherry Hill, New Jersey has since closed down.

Personal life
Trotter is married to Tammi Trotter. The married couple have three children. Trotter is a Christian. While playing with the Eagles, Trotter was a resident of Hainesport, New Jersey.

In September, 2019, Trotter's son Jeremiah Trotter Jr., then a junior at St. Joseph's Preparatory School in Philadelphia, announced his commitment to play for the Clemson Tigers. Jeremiah Jr.'s younger brother Josiah also plays for Prep. Both boys, like their father, are linebackers.

Trotter was captain of the Philadelphia Benjamins dodgeball team on the 3rd season of GSN's Extreme Dodgeball. The Benjamins were runners-up as they fell short in the championship match at the hands of the New York Bling, who were led by female boxer Mia St. Jon. In addition, Trotter not only led his team in kills, but also led the league in Big Ball kills. Extreme Dodgeball is an American Sports Entertainment television show that debuted on Game Show Network in 2004.  His nickname on the show was "The Axeman".
 
Trotter made his acting debut in 2013 in the independent film The North Star.

Trotter was inducted into the Philadelphia Eagles Hall of Fame on November 28, 2016.

Trotter is the uncle of former St. Louis Rams running back Terrance Ganaway.

References

External links
Current stats

1977 births
Living people
People from Hooks, Texas
People from Hainesport Township, New Jersey
Players of American football from Texas
American football middle linebackers
National Conference Pro Bowl players
Stephen F. Austin Lumberjacks football players
Washington Redskins players
Philadelphia Eagles players
Tampa Bay Buccaneers players